Administrator or admin may refer to:

Job roles

Computing and internet
 Database administrator, a person who is responsible for the environmental aspects of a database
 Forum administrator, one who oversees discussions on an Internet forum
 Network administrator, engineers involved in computer networks
 Server administrator, a person who acts as the administrator for an Internet gaming or other type of server
 Superuser, a type of computer user with administrative privileges
 Sysop, a commonly used term for a system operator, an administrator of a multi-user website
 Wikipedia administrators
 System administrator, a person responsible for running technically advanced information systems

Government
 Administrator of the Government, in various Commonwealth realms and territories
 Administrator (Australia), for use of the title in Australia
 In the independent agencies of the United States government, the administrator is the highest executive officer in an independent agency whose name ends with the word "administration"
 Administrator, a practitioner of public administration

Religion
 Administrator (of ecclesiastical property), anyone charged with the care of church property in the Roman Catholic Church 
 Diocesan administrator, a provisional ordinary of a Roman Catholic church
 Apostolic Administrator, a prelate appointed by the Pope to serve as the ordinary for an apostolic administration
 Administrator (medieval), the ruler of a prince-bishopric in medieval times who was not confirmed by the Pope

Other job roles
 Business administration, a person responsible for the performance or management of administrative business operations
 Administrator (law), a person appointed by a court to handle the administration of an estate for someone who has died without a will
 Academic administration, administration of a school
 Arts administrator, responsible for the business end of an arts organization
 Health administration, leadership, management, and administration of health organizations

Other uses
 Administrator (role), one of the roles in the Keirsey Temperament Sorter personality assessment scheme
 Administration (law), a procedure under the insolvency laws of a number of common law jurisdictions

See also
Administration (disambiguation)
 da share z0ne, a comedic social media account run by a fictitious skeleton character named "Admin"